Urban economics is broadly the economic study of urban areas; as such, it involves using the tools of economics to analyze urban issues such as crime, education, public transit, housing, and local government finance. More specifically, it is a branch of microeconomics that studies the urban spatial structure and the location of households and firms .

Much urban economic analysis relies on a particular model of urban spatial structure, the monocentric city model pioneered in the 1960s by William Alonso, Richard Muth, and Edwin Mills. While most other forms of neoclassical economics do not account for spatial relationships between individuals and organizations, urban economics focuses on these spatial relationships to understand the economic motivations underlying the formation, functioning, and development of cities.

Since its formulation in 1964, Alonso's monocentric city model of a disc-shaped Central Business District (CBD) and the surrounding residential region has served as a starting point for urban economic analysis. Monocentricity has weakened over time because of changes in technology, particularly, faster and cheaper transportation (which makes it possible for commuters to live farther from their jobs in the CBD) and communications (which allow back-office operations to move out of the CBD).

Additionally, recent research has sought to explain the polycentricity described in Joel Garreau's Edge City. Several explanations for polycentric expansion have been proposed and summarized in models that account for factors such as utility gains from lower average land rents and increasing (or constant) returns due to economies of agglomeration .

Introduction
Urban economics is rooted in the location theories of von Thünen, Alonso, Christaller, and Lösch that began the process of spatial economic analysis . Economics is the study of the allocation of scarce resources, and as all economic phenomena take place within a geographical space, urban economics focuses on the allocation of resources across space in relation to urban areas  . Other branches of economics ignore the spatial aspects of decision making but urban economics focuses not only on the location decisions of firms but also of cities themselves as cities themselves represent centers of economic activity .

Many spatial economic topics can be analyzed within either an urban or regional economics framework as some economic phenomena primarily affect localized urban areas while others are felt over much larger regional areas . Arthur O'Sullivan believes urban economics is divided into six related themes: market forces in the development of cities, land use within cities, urban transportation, urban problems and public policy, housing and public policy, and local government expenditures and taxes. .

Market forces in the development of cities
Market forces in the development of cities relate to how the location decision of firms and households causes the development of cities. The nature and behavior of markets depend somewhat on their locations therefore market performance partly depends on geography.. If a firm locates in a geographically isolated region, its market performance will be different than a firm located in a concentrated region. The location decisions of both firms and households create cities that differ in size and economic structure. When industries cluster, like in Silicon Valley in California, they create urban areas with dominant firms and distinct economies.

By looking at location decisions of firms and households, the urban economist is able to address why cities develop where they do, why some cities are large and others small, what causes economic growth and decline, and how local governments affect urban growth . Because urban economics is concerned with asking questions about the nature and workings of the economy of a city, models and techniques developed within the field are primarily designed to analyze phenomena that are confined within the limits of a single city .

Land use
Looking at land use within metropolitan areas, the urban economist seeks to analyze the spatial organization of activities within cities. In attempts to explain observed patterns of land use, the urban economist examines the intra-city location choices of firms and households. Considering the spatial organization of activities within cities, urban economics addresses questions in terms of what determines the price of land and why those prices vary across space, the economic forces that caused the spread of employment from the central core of cities outward, identifying land-use controls, such as zoning, and interpreting how such controls affect the urban economy .

Economic policy
Economic policy is often implemented at the urban level thus economic policy is often tied to urban policy . Urban problems and public policy tie into urban economics as the theme relates urban problems, such as poverty or crime, to economics by seeking to answer questions with economic guidance. For example, does the tendency for the poor to live close to one another make them even poorer? .

Transportation and economics
Urban transportation is a theme of urban economics because it affects land-use patterns as transportation affects the relative accessibility of different sites. Issues that tie urban transportation to urban economics include the deficit that most transit authorities have and efficiency questions about proposed transportation developments such as light-rail . Megaprojects such as this have been shown to be synonymous with unexpected costs and questionable benefits.

Housing and public policy
Housing and public policy relate to urban economics as housing is a unique type of commodity. Because housing is immobile, when a household chooses a dwelling, it is also choosing a location. Urban economists analyze the location choices of households in conjunction with the market effects of housing policies .
In analyzing housing policies, we make use of market structures e.g., perfect market structure. There are however problems encountered in making this analysis such as funding, uncertainty, space, etc.

Government expenditures and taxes
The final theme of local government expenditures and taxes relates to urban economics as it analyzes the efficiency of the fragmented local governments presiding in metropolitan areas .

See also

 Georgism
 Megaprojects
 MONU – magazine on urbanism
 New Urbanism
 Regional economics
 Regional science
 Rural economics
 Urban decay
 Urban ecology
 Urban geography
 Urban history
 Urban planning
 Urban sociology
 Urban studies
 Urban vitality

References

Literature

Further reading
Garreau, Joel. Edge City: Life on the New Frontier. 1992. Anchor. .
Kahn, Matthew. Green Cities: Urban Growth and the Environment. 2006. Brookings .
Obeng-Odoom, Franklin. Reconstructing Urban Economics: Towards a Political Economy of the Built Environment. 2016. Zed. 
Stilwell, Frank. Understanding Cities & Regions: Spatial Political Economy. 1993 .

 
Urban planning
Regional science